The SNCASE SE-1010 was a late 1940s French photo-survey aircraft designed and built by SNCASE for the Institut Géographique National, one prototype was built but it crashed and the project was cancelled.

Design and development
In 1945 SNCASE had designed a "stratospheric" transport for transatlantic postal work designated the SE-1000, it was not built but given a modified nose-section it was built as high-altitude photo-survey aircraft for the Institut Géographique National and designated the SE-1010. If not used as a survey aircraft it was proposed to produce it as a 14-passenger transport.

The SE-1010 was a sleek-looking, four-engined, mid-wing monoplane powered by four Gnome-Rhône 14R 14-cylinder two-row air-cooled radial engine. The prototype SE-1010, with French test registration F-WEEE, first flew on 24 November 1948. On 1 October 1949 the prototype entered a flat-spin during test flying from Mariganne, it crashed killing the six crew near Carcès. The project was canceled and the three aircraft being built were not completed.

Variants
SE-1000
Proposed four-engined stratospheric transatlantic postal aircraft, not built.
SE-1010
High-altitude photo-survey aircraft, one built.
SE-1011
Production aircraft: three under construction when project was abandoned.
SE-1015
Long-range 18 seater courier airliner'
SE-1020 Maritime patrol aircraft with Jumo 213 engines and gun turrets.
SE-1030
Proposed 40-passenger airliner variant, not built.
SE-1035
Proposed airliner variant, not built.
SE-1040Proposed turboprop test-bed to evaluate the Rolls-Royce Dart engine.

Specification (Survey aircraft)

References
Notes

Bibliography

 Chillon, Jacques. Dubois, Jean-Pierre and Wegg, John. French Postwar Transport Aircraft, Air-Britain, 1980, .

SE-1010
1940s French civil utility aircraft
Four-engined tractor aircraft
Mid-wing aircraft
Aircraft first flown in 1948
Four-engined piston aircraft